International Association for the Physical Sciences of the Oceans (IAPSO) is one of eight associations of the International Union of Geodesy and Geophysics (IUGG), constituted within the International Council of Science (ICSU). It was founded in 1919 as an oceanographic section of the IUGG and renamed an association in 1931. IAPSO is the primary body responsible for maintaining and improving oceanographic standards and practices. The President of IAPSO is Professor Trevor McDougall AC FAA FRS.

IAPSO’s Goal and Objectives 
IAPSO’s prime goal is "promoting the study of scientific problems relating to the oceans and the interactions taking places at the sea floor, coastal, and atmospheric boundaries insofar as such research is conducted by the use of mathematics, physics, and chemistry." This goal is addressed through four objectives:

 Organization, sponsorship, and co-sponsorship of formal and informal international events to facilitate communication of ocean scientists throughout the world;
 Establishment of commissions, sub-committees, and organization of commensurate workshops to support and coordinate new and advanced international research activities;
 Provision of services needed to conduct the physical oceanography;
 Publishing proceedings of the conducted events and fundamental references on the current state-of-the art and knowledge of physical oceanography.

Awards and honors

Prince Albert I Medal 
The Prince Albert I Medal is awarded by the Foundation Rainier III of Monaco every two years to scientists with outstanding contributions to the physical and/or chemical sciences of the oceans. In 2019 the recipient of Prince Albert I Medal became Dr. Corinne Le Quéré, FRS, Professor of Climate Change Science at the University of East Anglia, United Kingdom, and Director of the Tyndall Centre for Climate Change Research (2011-2018).

Eugene LaFond Medal 
The Eugene LaFond Medal is awarded to ocean scientists from developing countries for presentation (poster or oral) in a IAPSO-sponsored or co-sponsored symposium at the IUGG or IAPSO assemblies. In 2019 The Eugene LaFond Medal 2019 was awarded at the IUGG General Assembly in Montreal, Canada, July 8 - 18, 2019 to Rohith Balakrishnan from India.

IAPSO Early Career Scientist Medal       
The award is granted every two years to early career scientists for outstanding research in the physical/chemical sciences of the oceans and for their cooperation in international research. In 2019, Dr. Gerard McCarthy, Lecturer at the Irish Climate Analysis and Research Units, Maynooth University, Ireland became the recipient of the IAPSO Early Career Scientist medal in physical ocean science, and Dr. Mar Benavides, Scientific Researcher at the French National Research Institute for Sustainable Development, Mediterranean Institute of Oceanography, Marseille, France - the recipient of the IAPSO Early Career Scientist medal in chemical ocean science.

References 

Scientific organizations established in 1919
Members of the International Council for Science
Geographic societies
Oceanography
Earth sciences societies